The L.A. Black Rice Milling Association Inc. Office is a historic office building at 508 South Monroe Street in DeWitt, Arkansas.  It is a single-story brick structure with a low-pitch shed roof.  Built in 1942, the building has minimal styling, with a recessed porch on its eastern facade sheltering the entries to two storefronts.  It is notable as the only surviving element associated with the business activities of Lester Asher Black (1880-1945), a leading businessman in DeWitt.  Black was the president of the First National Bank of DeWitt from its founding in 1912 until his death, and operated a rice mill (no longer standing) as well as a hardware and agricultural supply store catering to rice farmers.  He also owned thousands of acres of land planted in rice, at a time when Arkansas was the largest national supplier of the crop.

The building was listed on the National Register of Historic Places in 2013.

See also
National Register of Historic Places listings in Arkansas County, Arkansas

References

Office buildings on the National Register of Historic Places in Arkansas
Buildings and structures completed in 1942
Buildings designated early commercial in the National Register of Historic Places
1942 establishments in Arkansas
National Register of Historic Places in Arkansas County, Arkansas
Rice production in the United States
DeWitt, Arkansas